The Kazakh ambassador in New Delhi is the official representative of the Government in Nur-Sultan to the Government of India.
The first new Embassy of India in Central Asia was opened in 1992 in Almaty, and Kazakhstan opened its embassy in New Delhi in 1993.

List of representatives

See also
India–Kazakhstan relations

References

External links
 Kazakh embassy in New Delhi

 
India
Kazakhstan